Süleyman Olgun (born 20 April 1987) is a Turkish professional footballer who plays as a right back for Muş 1984 Muşspor.

References

External links

1987 births
Sportspeople from Antalya
Living people
Turkish footballers
Association football defenders
Denizlispor footballers
Denizli Belediyespor footballers
Ankara Keçiörengücü S.K. footballers
Süper Lig players
TFF First League players
TFF Second League players
TFF Third League players